The 1920 All-Pro Team represented the All-Pro team for the 1920 season of the American Professional Football Association (APFA), later renamed the National Football League (NFL). It was compiled by sportswriter Bruce Copeland.

Teams

References 

1920 APFA All-Pros

All-Pro Teams
Allpro